Aladdin (commonly ) (various spellings and transliterations) is a male given name which means "nobility of faith" or "nobility of creed/religion". It is one of a large class of names ending with ad-Din. The name may refer to:

Given name
Ala al-Din Husayn (died 1161), king of the Ghurid dynasty from 1149 to 1161
Ala al-Din Atsiz (died 1214), Sultan of the Ghurid dynasty from 1213 to 1214
Ala al-Din Ali, last Sultan of the Ghurid dynasty, from 1214 to 1215
Kayqubad I or Alā ad-Dīn Kayqubād bin Kaykāvūs (1188–1237), Seljuq Sultan of Rûm
Alauddin Sabir Kaliyari (1196–1291), Sufi saint
Ala al-Din Abu al-Hassan Ali ibn Abi-Hazm al-Qurashi al-Dimashq, or Ibn al-Nafis (1213–1288), Arab Muslim polymath
Ata-Malik Juvayni (in full: Ala al-Din Ata-ullah) (1226–1283), Persian historian
Al al-Din (died 1312), Muslim Persian military expert who served in Kublai Khan's army
Allauddin Khan (c. 1862–1972), Indian musician
Alauddin Al-Azad (1932–2009), Bangladeshi writer
Allauddin (born 1923), Pakistani actor
Hassan Alaa Eddin (born 1939), Lebanese actor also known as Chouchou
Alā'-ud-dīn Muhammad Husni Sayyid Mubarak, Egyptian businessman
Aladdin (1912–1970), full name Aladdin Abdullah Achmed Anthony Pallante, violinist on The Lawrence Welk Show
Allaedin Ghoraifi (born 1945), Iraqi Twelver Shi'a Marja
Alaa El-Din Abdul Moneim (born 1951), Egyptian politician
Alaattin Çakıcı (born 1953), Turkish ultra-nationalist and convicted criminal
Alaeddine Yahia (born 1981), Tunisian-French footballer
Aladdin Allahverdiyev (born 1947), Soviet, Russian and Azerbaijani scientist, professor (2001)
Alauddin (born 1976), Pakistani cricketer
Alaeddin Boroujerdi, Iranian politician

Rulers
Alā ud-Dīn Atsiz (died 1156), Khwarazm Shah from 1127 until his death
Ala ad-Din Tekish (died 1200), Khwarazm Shah from 1172
Ala ad-Din Muhammad II of Khwarezm (died 1221), Khwarazm Shah from 1200
Ala ud din Masud, Sultan of Delhi from 1242 to 1246
Alaeddin Keykubad (disambiguation), three Seljuk sultans in Anatolia
Kayqubad I, 'Alā al-Dīn Kayqubād bin Kaykā'ūs (died 1237)
Kayqubad II, 'Alā al-Dīn Kayqubād bin Kaykhusraw (died 1256)
Kayqubad III, 'Alā al-Dīn Kayqubād bin Ferāmurz (died 1302)
Alauddin Khalji (died 1316), a sultan and military leader in India
Alaeddin Pasha (died 1331 or 1332), son of Osman I and brother of Orhan I, first Grand Vizier of the Ottoman Empire
Alauddin Ali Shah (died 1342), a ruler in Bengal
Ala'a ad-Din Kujuk (1334–1345), Mamluk Sultan of Egypt from 1341 to 1342
Ala-ud-Din Bahman Shah (died 1358), founder of the Bahmani Sultanate on the Indian subcontinent
Alauddin Riayat Shah of Malacca (died 1488), Sultan of Malacca
Alauddin Husain Shah (died 1519), Sultan of Bengal
Alauddin Riayat Shah II of Johor (died 1564), founder of the Sultanate of Johor, grandson of Alauddin Riayat Shah of Malacca
Alauddin al-Kahar (died 1571), Sultan of Aceh
Alauddin Alam Shah, regnal name of Tengku Alam Shah (1846–1891), the last Malay sultan of Singapore

Surname
Ali Alaaeddine (born 1993), Lebanese footballer
Dlawer Ala'Aldeen (born 1960), Minister of Higher Education and Scientific Research, Kurdistan Regional Government, Iraq*
Muhammad Aladdin (born 1979), Egyptian writer

Fictional characters
 Aladdin from One Thousand and One Nights
 Aladdin, from the 1992 Disney film Aladdin and its franchise
 Aladdin, a main character of the manga/anime Magi: The Labyrinth of Magic
 Admiral General Aladeen from The Dictator

See also
Aladdin (disambiguation)
, Aladdin is sometimes confused with Allah-ad-din

Arabic masculine given names
Iranian masculine given names
Turkish masculine given names